Robbe Quirynen (born 3 November 2001) is a Belgian professional footballer who plays as a defender for Beerschot.

Club career
He made his Belgian First Division A debut for Antwerp on 4 August 2019 in a game against Waasland-Beveren.

On 27 January 2022, Quirynen signed with Deinze until the end of the 2021–22 season.

On 10 April 2022, Quirynen signed a two-year deal with Beerschot.

Honours
Antwerp
 Belgian Cup: 2019–20

References

External links
 

2001 births
People from Malle
Footballers from Antwerp Province
Living people
Belgian footballers
Belgium youth international footballers
Association football defenders
Royal Antwerp F.C. players
Royal Excel Mouscron players
K.M.S.K. Deinze players
K Beerschot VA players
Belgian Pro League players
Challenger Pro League players